The Kürtün Dam is a concrete-face rock-fill dam on the Harşit River located  east of Kürtün in Gümüşhane Province, Turkey. The development was backed by the Turkish State Hydraulic Works. Construction began in 1986 and the reservoir started to fill in 2002. The dam was completed in 2003 and its underground power station became operational in 2004. The dam is connected with  road tunnel, constructed to link the dam site to Kürtün. The hydroelectric power station, located below and just downstream of the right abutment of the dam, has an installed capacity of 80 MW.

See also

Torul Dam
List of dams and reservoirs in Turkey

References

Dams in Gümüşhane Province
Concrete-face rock-fill dams
Hydroelectric power stations in Turkey
Dams completed in 2003
Dams on the Harşit River
2004 establishments in Turkey
Energy infrastructure completed in 2004
Underground power stations
21st-century architecture in Turkey